Charles Lamont "Chip" Jenkins Jr. (born April 9, 1964 in New York, New York) is a former American track and field athlete. Jenkins won a gold medal at the 1992 Summer Olympics in Barcelona.  Jenkins is the son of Charles "Charlie" Jenkins Sr., Olympic champion of 1956.

See also 

 Athletics at the 1992 Summer Olympics – Men's 4 × 400 metres relay

References 

 
 

1964 births
Track and field athletes from New York City
American male sprinters
Athletes (track and field) at the 1992 Summer Olympics
Olympic gold medalists for the United States in track and field
Living people
Medalists at the 1992 Summer Olympics
Georgetown Preparatory School alumni
World Athletics Indoor Championships medalists